TurnTable is a Nigerian music and entertainment magazine founded by Ayomide Oriowo, and Similoluwa Adegoke. TurnTable focuses primarily on music charts, news, and events. Its music charts include the Top 100, and the Year-End chart. TurnTable magazine has two issues, and its first issue was published on 19 December 2020, by Similoluwa Adegoke. Its issues are printed in English language.

History
TurnTable was founded in 2020, by Ayomide Oriowo, and Similoluwa Adegoke. On 3 July 2020, TurnTable launched its Top 50 chart, and started operations on 9 November 2020. In December, it began publishing the Top 50 End-Year chart. Since its launch, the magazine has covered Chike, Lojay, and Asake in its issues. The magazine features include: Bizzle Osikoya, Asa Asika, Namenj, Tempoe, Weird MC, Yemi Alade, Ayra Starr, Fave, Don Jazzy, Bose Ogulu. Niphkeys, Jae5, AV, Mayorkun,  Snazzy the Optimist, Victony, Rema, Khaid, Spyro, Ayra Starr, Libianca, Ruger, Tiwa Savage, Reward Beatz, Seyi Shay, Burna Boy, Shay Jones, Aṣa, Omawumi, and Wiz Jones.

On 12 September 2022, Ayomide Oriowo announced the exit of Adeayo Adebiyi, the Co-Editor-in-chief of TurnTable.

News publishing
TurnTable publishes a news website and a yearly magazine that covers music, and entertainment. It covers news, charts, interviews, and music reviews, but its major influential creation is the TurnTable charts. The charts track music airplay (radio, and television), and digital streaming. The TurnTable Top 50 chart of the top streamed and selling songs was introduced in 2020. On 31 March 2022, it announce the expansion of the Top 50 into 100. On 11 July 2022, it released it first issue of the TurnTable Nigeria Top 100. The website includes the TurnTable charts, news separated by chart news, and genre. Its print magazine sections include:
TurnTable End of the Year: A chart of the top 50 most popular songs of the year.
TurnTable Power List: Top 30 most influential individuals serving in various capacities in the Nigerian music industry.
TurnTable NXT: A chart for emerging creatives who are contributing to the Nigerian story.
Next Rated Leaderboard: A chart for best performing new artiste.
Industry Digest: A monthly issue with a view of presenting news, interviews and insights into everything Nigerian music and Afrobeats.

References

Entertainment magazines
Music magazines
Magazines established in 2020
Magazines published in Lagos
Online magazines published in Nigeria
TurnTable